"Pretty Lady" is a 1973 song by Canadian rock band Lighthouse.  The song was the lead single of three released from their Can You Feel It LP. 
It was written by lead singer Skip Prokop. 

The song reached number 53 on Billboard and number 31 on Cash Box.  It was their final charting single in the United States, and became their third greatest hit. It was the group's second of two hits on the Adult Contemporary chart, reaching number 38, after "One Fine Morning" had hit number 30 two years earlier.

In their native Canada, "Pretty Lady" reached the Top 10, and was not their final hit.  It reached as high as number nine, for two weeks during the winter of 1974.

In Popular Culture
An intoxicated Sam Losco sang it to an approving Barbara Lahey and her baffled ex-husband Jim Lahey on the popular Canadian sitcom The Trailer Park Boys in the mid-2000s.

Chart history

Weekly charts

Year-end charts

References

External links
 Lyrics of this song
 

1973 songs
1973 singles
Lighthouse (band) songs
Song recordings produced by Jimmy Ienner
Polydor Records singles
Canadian soft rock songs 
1970s ballads